Lethal Weapon is an American buddy cop action-comedy media franchise created by Shane Black. It focuses on two Los Angeles Police Department (LAPD) detectives, Martin Riggs and Roger Murtaugh. The franchise consists of a series of four films released between 1987 and 1998 and a television series which aired from 2016 to 2019. The four films were directed by Richard Donner and also share many of the same core cast members, while the television series is a reboot with different actors. Although the first film was not explicitly a comedy, the later films and the television series gradually became comedic in nature.

A proposed fifth Lethal Weapon film had been in talks and development since 2007, but has yet to make it into production. In September of 2022, director Mel Gibson expressed confidence that the film would begin shooting in the early months of 2023, and will most likely see a release date the same year.

Films

Lethal Weapon (1987)

Anxious with age and retirement, homicide detective Roger Murtaugh (Danny Glover) is partnered with young and suicidal narcotics officer Martin Riggs (Mel Gibson). Together, they work the case of the alleged suicide of Amanda Hunsaker (Jackie Swanson), daughter of a wealthy businessman who served with Murtaugh in Vietnam. Murtaugh and Riggs soon discover that Hunsaker was involved in a heroin-smuggling scheme led by a retired general (Mitchell Ryan) and his lead enforcer (Gary Busey).

Lethal Weapon 2 (1989)

During a car chase, Riggs and Murtaugh stumble upon a trunk full of smuggled South African Krugerrands. This sparks a series of attempts at their lives, forcing them to take a less dangerous case, protecting Leo Getz (Joe Pesci), a loud-mouthed whistleblower with whom they gradually bond and befriend. However, they realize that Getz was involved in the same South African illegal activities. As a result, the three men become entangled in a drug-smuggling operation involving South African diplomats in Los Angeles, using their immunity and biting wit as a shield. Riggs kills the murderer of his wife who is among the criminals.

Lethal Weapon 3 (1992)

As Murtaugh, who is one week from retiring, and Riggs investigate a robbery committed using a duplicate armored car, they find themselves in the middle of an Internal Affairs investigation led by Sergeant Lorna Cole (Rene Russo). With assistance from Leo, they learn that the subject of the investigation is a rogue cop (Stuart Wilson) who is stealing impounded weapons and selling them on the black market. During the investigation, Murtaugh shoots and kills a teenager who attacks him and Riggs; he turns out to be a friend of his own son. This prompts Murtaugh to capture the man responsible for the distribution of illegal firearms and to rethink his retirement.

Lethal Weapon 4 (1998)

While Lorna and Murtaugh's daughter Rianne are both pregnant, Riggs and Murtaugh once again team up with Leo as well as rookie Detective Lee Butters (Chris Rock) to investigate a Chinese immigrant smuggling ring. Wah Sing Ku (Jet Li) is a ruthless enforcer who personally attempts to murder Murtaugh's family by burning them alive in their home. Murtaugh discovers that Butters is the father of his daughter's unborn child. The two kill dozens of Chinese gangsters and ultimately manage to catch up with the boss of the smuggling ring. Riggs and Lorna are married at the end of the film as their child is born.

Lethal Finale (2023)
There had long been talk of a fifth Lethal Weapon film, although both Gibson and Danny Glover initially expressed a lack of interest. Gibson confirmed in November 2021 that he was in talks to direct and star in the fifth film, saying that he would be helming the film to honor Donner, who wrote the screenplay and was originally set to direct the film prior to his death in July 2021.  It was reported that Richard Wenk (The Equalizer, Jack Reacher: Never Go Back) had drafted the screenplay. In September 2022, Gibson expressed confidence that the film would begin shooting in early 2023, and may see a release date the same year.

Television

Lethal Weapon (2016–2019)

A television adaptation of the film series was developed by Matthew Miller as co-executive producer, along with Dan Lin and Jennifer Gwartz for Fox. Clayne Crawford and Damon Wayans starred as Riggs and Murtaugh. Other cast include Keesha Sharp replacing Golden Brooks as Trish, Jordana Brewster as Dr. Maureen Cahill, Kevin Rahm as Captain Brooks Avery, Chandler Kinney as Riana Murtaugh, Dante Brown as Roger "R.J." Murtaugh Jr., Johnathan Fernandez as Scorsese, and Thomas Lennon in the recurring role of Leo Getz. Fox gave Lethal Weapon a series order in May 2016. For the third season, Crawford was replaced by Seann William Scott, as a new character named Wesley Cole. Crawford was fired from the show after Fox and Warner Bros. refused to aid in escalating tensions between Crawford and Wayans, and the series killed off the character of Riggs. After three seasons Fox canceled the show in May 2019.

Cast and crew

Cast
 A  indicates the actor portrayed the role of a younger version of the character.
 A  indicates the actor portrayed the role of the character in a photograph.
 A dark gray cell indicates the character was not in the film.

Crew

Reception

Box office performance

Critical and public response

Music

Soundtracks

Singles

Other media

Video game
 Lethal Weapon – based on Lethal Weapon 3, released in 1992.

Pinball
 Lethal Weapon 3 - released in 1992

Theme park ride
 Lethal Weapon – The Ride

References

 
American film series
Action film franchises
Film franchises introduced in 1987
Warner Bros. Pictures franchises